Krasne  is a village in Rzeszów County, Subcarpathian Voivodeship, in south-eastern Poland. It is the seat of the gmina (administrative district) called Gmina Krasne.

The village has a population of 3,500.

References

Villages in Rzeszów County